SPARC (Scalable Processor Architecture) is a computer instruction set architecture.

SPARC may also refer to:

Organizations 
 Scholarly Publishing and Academic Resources Coalition
 School of the Performing Arts in the Richmond Community, a nonprofit organization in Virginia
 Social and Public Art Resource Center, a community arts center in Venice, California
 Society for the Protection of the Rights of the Child in Pakistan
 SPARC Innovation Program, a research program at Mayo Clinic, and its "See-Plan-Act-Refine-Communicate" method
 Sport and Recreation New Zealand, the former name of Sport New Zealand, a Crown entity
 Stratospheric Processes And their Role in Climate, a project of the World Climate Research Programme
 Summer Program on Applied Rationality and Cognition, a summer program sponsored by the Center for Applied Rationality

Technology 
 SPARC, Scalable Processor Architecture 
 ANSI-SPARC Architecture, a database design standard
 Osteonectin, a glycoprotein also known as SPARC (secreted protein, acidic and rich in cysteine)
 SPARC (tokamak), a proposed compact tokamak fusion experiment to be built by Commonwealth Fusion Systems and MIT based on the ARC fusion reactor
 Spitzer Photometry and Accurate Rotation Curves, a database of galaxy rotation curves collected by the Spitzer Space Telescope

See also
Spark (disambiguation)
Sparks (disambiguation)
Sparq (disambiguation)
 SPAC (disambiguation)